Acerella is a genus of proturans in the family Acerentomidae.

Species
 Acerella filisensillatus (Gisin, 1945)
 Acerella montana Martynova, 1970
 Acerella muscorum (Ionesco, 1930)
 Acerella remyi (Condé, 1944)
 Acerella sharovi Martynova, 1977
 Acerella tiarnea Berlese, 1908

References

Protura